Tomo Mahorič (born April 28, 1965) is a Slovenian basketball coach. He was a coach of Krško, Slovan, Union Olimpija, Lietuvos rytas, BC Kyiv, Vanoli Cremona and JSA Bordeaux Basket.

External links 
 Eurobasket.com Profile 
 Kotnik Sports Agency Profile 

1965 births
Living people
Slovenian basketball coaches
BC Rytas coaches
KK Olimpija coaches
Sportspeople from Ljubljana